Giovanni Gonnelli, also known as il Cieco da Gambassi ("The blindman from Gambassi"; April 4, 1603 – 1664) was an Italian sculptor of the Baroque period, born in Tuscany. He is one of the biographies featured by Filippo Baldinucci.

He became a blind sculptor. According to Baldinucci, he had been discovered in the studio of the elder Pietro Tacca by the duke of Mantua, Carlo Gonzaga. However, following the Duke back to his capital meant that he suffered from the siege of the city by German troops in 1630. During this time, and perhaps due to the effects of deprivation and labor, he became completely blind. Back in Tuscany, after a spell of melancholy, he began to sculpt again in clay, and his work aroused accolades and patronage from the likes of the Grand Duke of Tuscany, Ferdinand and Pope Urban VIII. He traveled to Rome to display his work. Baldinucci recounts that one patron forced him to work in a dark room. He lived comfortably, and remained jolly. He had ten children, played guitar and sang, and engaged in various love affairs.

References

Notizie de' professori del disegno... by Filippo Baldinucci and others (1681). p. 253. 
:it:Giovanni Gonnelli 

1603 births
1664 deaths
People from the Province of Florence
17th-century Italian sculptors
Italian male sculptors
Italian Baroque sculptors
Blind artists